Giorgio Cecchetti (born 11 September 1944) is a Sammarinese alpine skier. He competed in the men's giant slalom at the 1976 Winter Olympics.

References

1944 births
Living people
Sammarinese male alpine skiers
Olympic alpine skiers of San Marino
Alpine skiers at the 1976 Winter Olympics
Place of birth missing (living people)